The Lucknow Literary Festival is an international literary festival held annually in Lucknow, Uttar Pradesh, India since 2013.

The Lucknow Literary Festival is an endeavour of the Lucknow Society, which is a non profit organization dedicated to the cause of promoting & conserving the culture, tehzeeb & heritage of Lucknow. The Lucknow Literary Festival is an initiative that acknowledges new literary talents, honors our legends, while restoring literary tradition of the past, Lucknow’s own unique heritage and also evoking the newer generation’s interest. The event is also replete with entertainment for the literary taste. While, on one hand, the Lucknow Literary Festival has become a hub of the glitz from all across the country, it also dawns the light upon Lucknow's own talent and gives them a stage to showcase themselves in our cultural programs.

It is a 3-day event that celebrates creativity in all its forms. It is held each year in Lucknow, during the month of February/March, and celebrates excellence in Indian and International writing.

As one among the top 6 literary festival in India, as stated by Outlook magazine, It brings together some of the greatest thinkers and writers from across the world. From Nobel laureates to local language writers, Padma Shri holders to debut novelists, every February the most remarkable, witty, sensitive and brilliant collection of authors come together for three days of readings, debates and discussions at one platform. Its programme includes conversations with authors, readings, panel discussions, workshops, book launches, cultural programmes, events for college students and school children. Lucknow Literary Festival plays host to nearly 100 writers from across India, and other countries writing in various Indian languages and English every year. The Lucknow Literary Festival has been adorned with sundry of well - known names and faces that not only grace the event with their presence but also share their experiences, their insights with young and old alike.

The Lucknow Literary Festival too confers "Pride of Lucknow" award and "Wajid Ali Shah" award, which are given to people who have been contributing extraordinarily in different spheres of life. These people may belong to various fields like Hindi writing, Urdu writing, Journalism, Social service etc. These eminent personalities belong to Lucknow and even across India respectively.

Editions

1st Edition of Lucknow Literary Festival  - 23–24 March 2013 

2nd Edition of Lucknow Literary Festival  - 1–2 February 2014 

3rd Edition of Lucknow Literary Festival  - 13–15 February 2015 

4th Edition of Lucknow Literary Festival  - 19–21 February 2016 

5th Edition of Lucknow Literary Festival  - 10–12 November 2017 

6th Edition of Lucknow Literary Festival  - 28–30 December 2018

References

Culture of Lucknow
Literary festivals in India